In enzymology, a ceramide phosphoethanolamine synthase (EC 2.7.8.-) is an enzyme that catalyzes the chemical reaction

a ceramide + a phosphoethanolamine head group donor  a ceramide-phosphoethanolamine + side product

Ceramide phosphoethanolamine (CPE) is a sphingolipid consisted of a ceramide and a phosphoethanolamine head group. Thus, this class of enzymes uses ceramide and a donor molecule for phosphoethanolamine as substrates to produce a ceramide phosphoethanolamine and a side product. The head group donor for phosphoethanolamine can be either phosphatidylethanolamine or CDP-ethanolamine, thus the side product is either a 1,2-diacylglycerol or a CMP, respectively.

This enzyme belongs to the family of transferases, specifically those transferring non-standard substituted phosphate groups.

Mammalian Ceramide Phosphoethanolamine Synthases
In mammalian cells, two CPE synthase activities have been described, one resides in the endoplasmic reticulum, and the other one is associated with the plasma membrane. The endoplasmic reticulum-resident CPE synthase, SMSr, is identified as a monofunctional CPE synthase produces trace amounts of CPE. On the other hand, mammalian CPE synthase that is on the plasma membrane, SMS2, is a bifunctional enzyme that produces both CPE and sphingomyelin, thus also functioning as a sphingomyelin synthase. Both mammalian CPE synthases, SMS2 and SMSr, use phosphatidylethanolamine (PE) as head group donor and catalyzes the reaction

a ceramide + a phosphatidylethanolamine  a ceramide-phosphoethanolamine + 1,2-diacylglycerol

Invertebrate Ceramide Phosphoethanolamine Synthases
SMSr protein is found in all organisms throughout the animal kingdom as a CPE synthase, yet it produces trace amounts of CPE. Drosophila and a group of invertebrates lack SMS2 homologues. This group of invertebrates synthesizes CPE using a particular enzyme called CPES. CPES uses CDP-ethanolamine rather than phosphatidylethanolamine as head group donor, thus catalyzes the reaction 

a ceramide + a CDP-ethanolamine  a ceramide-phosphoethanolamine + CMP

CPES uses a different reaction mechanism than the one sphingomyelin synthase uses, but very similar to that of enzymes involved in synthesis of phosphatidyl ethanolamine (EC 2.7.8.1) via the Kennedy pathway.

References

EC 2.7.8